Michael Johns may refer to:

 Michael Johns (policy analyst) (born 1964), American business executive, federal government official, and writer
 Michael Johns (singer) (1978–2014), Australian singer/songwriter
 Michael M. E. Johns, American physician